The 2016 Wrestling World Cup – Men's freestyle was The last of a set of three Wrestling World Cups in 2016.

Pool stage

Pool A

Pool B

Medal Matches

Final classement

See also
2016 Wrestling World Cup - Men's Greco-Roman
2016 World wrestling clubs Cup - Men's freestyle

References

https://unitedworldwrestling.org

https://unitedworldwrestling.org/event/world-cup-senior-2

External links

Men's freestyle
International wrestling competitions hosted by the United States